Utah State Route 170 may refer to:

(From 1955 to 1969 this roadway had also been designated as Utah State Route 256.)
 Utah State Route 170 (1935-1969), a former state highway in the Cache Valley in Cache County, Utah, United States, that connected Utah State Route 142 in Trenton with Utah State Route 1 (U.S. Route 91) in Richmond and was added to Utah State Route 142 in 1969

See also

 List of state highways in Utah
 List of highways numbered 170

External links

 Utah Department of Transportation Highway Resolutions: Route 170 (PDF)